MotorLand Aragón (alternative Spanish name: Circuito de Alcañiz) is a  race track used for motorsports located in Alcañiz, Spain.

The circuit was designed by German architect Hermann Tilke in conjunction with the British architectural business Foster and Partners. Formula One driver Pedro de la Rosa was a technical and sporting consultant on the project.

The facility has been designed to incorporate three main zones; a technology park, a sports area and a leisure and culture area. The technology park will feature research and educational institutes related to the motor industry, the sports area will include the racing circuit (with multiple layouts), a karting track and various gravel circuits, whilst the leisure and culture section will feature a hotel, business centre and shopping facilities.

History
It was announced on 26 May, 2008 that the circuit will host a round of the World Series by Renault in 2009, the first international championship to race at the venue. The event has returned to Aragón every year since, until the end of the championship in 2015. Renault Sport Technologies had access to the circuit for thirty days per year for testing and promotional events. When the World Series by Renault championship was discontinued at the end of 2015 and was relaunched in 2016 as Formula V8 3.5, the circuit continued to be part of the schedule. The race remained on the championship for the 2017 season, at the end of which the championship was discontinued.

On 18 March, 2010, MotorLand Aragón was announced as a replacement for the Balatonring on the 2010 MotoGP calendar. Aragón was already in place as a reserve event and replaced the Hungarian race which was postponed because of overrunning construction work. This made the Aragon motorcycle Grand Prix the fourth Spanish race on the calendar. In March 2011 Dorna Sports signed a contract with the circuit to make it a permanent entry on the main calendar until at least 2016. On 19 May, 2010, it was announced that the circuit will hold a round of the Superbike World Championship from 2011, with a three-year deal being agreed.

The circuit was used as part of stage 7 of the 2012 Vuelta a España.

The circuit was planned to host round 6 of the 2020 World Touring Car Cup on 5 July, replacing Circuit Zandvoort on the calendar. However, due to the COVID-19 pandemic, the race was postponed. The circuit instead hosted two WTCR rounds (Race of Spain, Race of Aragón) on 31 October–1 November and 14–15 November respectively. The circuit continues to host WTCR races after 2020.

Fatalities
On 25 July, 2021, during the 2021 European Talent Cup, Hugo Millán died in a crash. He was 14 at the time.

Events

 Current

 April: Campeonato de España de Superbike
 May: Eurocup-3, F4 Spanish Championship, TCR Spain Campeonato de España de Superturismos
 June: Campeonato de España de Resistencia
 August: European Le Mans Series 4 Hours of Aragón
 September: Superbike World Championship, F4 Spanish Championship, TCR Spain Campeonato de España de Superturismos
 October: FIM CEV Moto3 Junior World Championship, FIM CEV Moto2 European Championship
 November: Motorland Classic Festival

 Former

 Eurocup Formula Renault 2.0 (2009–2016)
 F4 Eurocup 1.6 (2009–2010)
 Grand Prix motorcycle racing
 Aragon motorcycle Grand Prix (2010–2022)
 Teruel motorcycle Grand Prix (2020)
 Pure ETCR (2021)
 Racecar Euro Series (2011)
 Sidecar World Championship (2013–2014)
 V de V Sports (2016)
 Vuelta a España (2012)
 World Series Formula V8 3.5 (2009–2017)
 World Touring Car Cup
 Race of Aragón (2020)
 FIA WTCR Race of Spain (2020–2022)

Lap records 

The official fastest race lap records at the MotorLand Aragón are listed as:

References

External links

Official website:
Project profile at Fosters and Partners:
Renault-Sport official website:

FIA Grade 4 circuit
MotorLand Aragón
MotorLand Aragón
MotorLand Aragón
MotorLand Aragón
Sports venues in Aragon
MotorLand Aragón